Tropical Storm Nell may refer to:

 Tropical Storm Nell (1990) (T9026, 28W)
 Tropical Storm Nell (1993) (T9328, 37W, Puring)

Pacific typhoon set index articles